The VaMP driverless car was one of the first truly autonomous cars  along with its twin vehicle, the VITA-2. They were able to drive in heavy traffic for long distances without human intervention, using computer vision to recognize rapidly moving obstacles such as other cars, and automatically avoid and pass them.

The VaMP was constructed by the team of Ernst Dickmanns at the Bundeswehr University of Munich and Mercedes-Benz in the 1990s as part of the 800 million ECU EUREKA Prometheus Project on autonomous vehicles (1987–1995). It was a 500 SEL Mercedes re-engineered such that it was possible to control steering wheel, throttle, and brakes through computer commands based on real-time evaluation of image sequences. Software was written that translated sensory data into appropriate driving commands. Due to the limited computing power of the time period, sophisticated computer vision strategies were necessary to react in real time. The Dickmanns team solved the problem through an innovative approach to dynamic computer vision.  Attention control including artificial saccadic movements of the platform carrying the cameras allowed the system to focus its attention on the most relevant details of the visual input. Four cameras with two different focal lengths for each hemisphere were used in parallel for this purpose. Kalman filters were extended to handle perspective imaging and to achieve robust autonomous driving even in the presence of noise and uncertainty. Sixty transputers, a type of parallel computers, were used to deal with the enormous (by 1990s standards) computational demands.

In 1994, the VaMP and its twin VITA-2 were stars of the final international presentation of the PROMETHEUS project in October 1994 on Autoroute 1 near the Charles-de-Gaulle airport in Paris. They demonstrated lane changes left and right, autonomously passing other cars after maneuver approval by the safety driver.

However, only in a few critical situations (such as unmodeled construction areas) a safety driver took over completely. Again, active computer vision was used to deal with rapidly changing street scenes. Despite being a research system without emphasis on long distance reliability, it drove up to  without any human intervention.

Most current robot cars as well as commercial vehicles with driver assistance use GPS so that they know precisely where they are. However, the VaMP did not use GPS, and relied on vision only.

The VaMP and VITA-2 projects pioneered many hardware and software concepts that are essential for autonomous robots. They left a big impression on many observers and heavily influenced robot car research and funding decisions worldwide.  Since May 2006, VaMP is on display at the Deutsches Museum in Munich, Germany.

See also 
 Driverless car
 VIAC the Intercontinental Autonomous Challenge of 2010
 EUREKA Prometheus Project
 DARPA Grand Challenge
 ELROB trials

References 

Experimental self-driving cars